A Daughter of Luxury is a 1922 American silent comedy film directed by Paul Powell and written by Beulah Marie Dix based upon the play The Imposter by Leonard Merrick and Michael Morton. The film stars Agnes Ayres, Tom Gallery, Edith Yorke, Howard Ralston, Edward Martindel, and Sylvia Ashton. The film was released on December 4, 1922, by Paramount Pictures.

Plot
When a lawsuit deprives a rich woman, Mary Fenton, of her wealth, she decides to impersonate another woman, Mary Cosgrove. The situation becomes sticky when Cosgroge turns up and demands Fenton be arrested.

Cast 
Agnes Ayres as Mary Fenton
Tom Gallery as Blake Walford
Edith Yorke as Ellen Marsh
Howard Ralston as Bill Marsh
Edward Martindel as Loftus Walford
Sylvia Ashton as Mrs. Walford
Clarence Burton as Red Conroy
ZaSu Pitts as Mary Cosgrove
Robert Schable as Charlie Owen
Bernice Frank as Winnie
Dorothy Gordon as Genevieve Fowler
Muriel McCormac as Nancy

See also 
 (1918)
The Darling of the Rich (1922)

References

External links

1922 films
1920s English-language films
Silent American comedy films
Paramount Pictures films
Films directed by Paul Powell (director)
American black-and-white films
American silent feature films
Remakes of American films
American films based on plays
1922 comedy films
1920s American films